The Ohanapecosh Glacier is small glacier located on Mount Rainier's southeastern flanks in Washington. The glacier consists of several lobes of ice interconnected by thin snowfields. Since this ice lobe ends on a cliff, it contributes ice to the lower portions of the Ohanapecosh Glacier. Meltwater from the glacier drains into the Ohanapecosh River and the Muddy Fork Cowlitz River, which merge downstream about four miles (6 km) outside of Mount Rainier National Park into the Cowlitz River.

See also
List of glaciers

References

Glaciers of Mount Rainier
Glaciers of Washington (state)